Lemouroudougou is a town in the Banfora Department of Comoé Province in south-western Burkina Faso. According to the most recent census, the town has a population of 1,060.

References

Populated places in the Cascades Region
Comoé Province